O M C Narayanan Nambudiripad, an eminent Sanskrit scholar was born to the famous Nambudiri family of Olappamanna Mana on 24 June 1910 in Vellinezhi (Palakkad District, Kerala, India). He is known for his translation into Malayalam of the Rigveda. This work titled Rigveda Bhasha Bhashyam is an exhaustive interpretative analysis of the Rigveda alternatively known as Deviprasadam. After his death on 4 April 1989 aged 79, a trust was constituted in his memory. The Deviprasadam Trust (constituted in 1990) at Olappamanna Mana hands out awards annually to honour masters in Sanskrit, Vedas, Malayalam literature and Kathakali.

O M C Narayanan Nambudiripad, was known for his nationalist and Gandhian views. He was the son of O.M Vasudevan Nambudiripad (a well known administrator and writer of Kathakali plays) and the grandson of O.M Vasudevan Nambudiripad who was a scholar in both the Trissur and Tirunavaya Vedic Schools (Brahmaswam Madham). He was married to Uma Antharjanam, the daughter of another reputed Sanskrit scholar Kurur Unni Nambudiripad. Sumangala, a popular author of children's books is his eldest daughter.  OMC Narayanan Nambudiripad's father was the uncle of writer and reformer Moothiringode Bhavathrathan Namboothiripad.

See also
 Deviprasadam Trust Award

References
 Olappamanna Mana
 Namboothiri Websites Trust
  The Hindu, 25 February 2005

1910 births
1989 deaths
20th-century Indian linguists
Indian Vedic scholars
People from Palakkad district
20th-century Indian translators
Scholars from Kerala